Sailing at the 2014 Summer Youth Olympics was held from 18 to 23 August at Jinniu Lake in Nanjing, China.

Qualification

Each National Olympic Committee (NOC) could enter a maximum of 4 boats, 1 per event. As hosts, China was given the maximum quota of 4, but since they did not compete in any of the qualification events, the spots were reallocated. An extra additional spot was created in the girls' Techno 293 event and given to China. A further 8, 2 in each event, was decided by the Tripartite Commission. The remaining 88 places were allocated based on qualification events, namely the 2013 World Championships and six continental qualification tournaments for each boat. If a country declined a spot or if there were spots that remained unfilled after the qualification event, the quota was reallocated to another nation, with priority going to nations that had not qualified for any sailing events.

To be eligible to participate at the Youth Olympics athletes must have been born between 1 January 1998 and 31 December 1999.

Byte CII

  Reallocation spot

Techno 293

  Reallocation spot

Schedule

The schedule was released by the Nanjing Youth Olympic Games Organizing Committee.

All times are CST (UTC+8)

Medal summary

Medal table

Boys

Girls

References

External links
Official Results Book – Sailing

 
2014 Summer Youth Olympics events
Youth Summer Olympics
2014
Sailing competitions in China